The 2002 FIFA World Cup UEFA–AFC qualification play-off was a two-legged home-and-away tie between a group runner-up of the European qualifying tournament, the Republic of Ireland, and the winners of the AFC play-off, Iran. The games were played on 10 November and 15 November 2001 in Dublin and Tehran, respectively.

Ireland beat Iran 2–0 in the first leg held in Dublin, while in the second leg, Iran defeated Ireland 1–0 in Tehran. The Irish side won the series 2–1 on aggregate, therefore qualifying to the World Cup.

Venues

Background

Match details

First leg

Second leg

Aftermath
The elimination saw Iran manager Miroslav Blažević step down to be replaced by his assistant, Branko Ivanković.

The Republic of Ireland qualified to the 2002 FIFA World Cup and were drawn into Group E with Germany, Cameroon and Saudi Arabia. They drew with Cameroon and Germany with a score of 1–1 and in the final match, they won 3–0 against Saudi Arabia. This qualified them to the Round of 16 but they were eliminated by Spain on penalties (2–3) after the match ended in a 1–1 draw.

References

FIFA
FIFA
Play-off UEFA-AFC
2002
Republic of Ireland national football team matches
Iran national football team matches
qual
November 2001 sports events in Europe
November 2001 sports events in Asia
2000s in Dublin (city)
21st century in Tehran
Football
Sport in Tehran
International association football competitions hosted by the Republic of Ireland
International association football competitions hosted by Iran